Glia maturation factor is a neurotrophic factor implicated in nervous system development, angiogenesis and immune function. In humans, the glia maturation factor beta and glia maturation factor gamma proteins are encoded by the GMFB and GMFG genes, respectively.

The structures of mouse glia maturation factors beta and gamma, solved by both crystallography and NMR, reveal similarities and critical differences with ADF-H (actin depolymerization factor homology) domains and suggest new means of experimentally addressing the function of this protein family.

References

See also

 

Growth factors
Neurotrophic factors